The 1994 Pacific Grand Prix (formally the I Pacific Grand Prix) was a Formula One motor race held on 17 April 1994 at the TI Circuit, Aida, Japan. It was the second race of the 1994 Formula One World Championship.

The 83-lap race was won by German driver Michael Schumacher, driving a Benetton-Ford, after he started from second position. Brazilian Ayrton Senna took pole position in his Williams-Renault but retired following a first-corner collision with the Ferrari of Italian Nicola Larini, leaving Schumacher to lead all 83 laps. Austrian Gerhard Berger was second in the other Ferrari with another Brazilian, Rubens Barrichello, third in a Jordan-Hart, his and the Jordan team's first podium finish.

Report

Qualifying
Ayrton Senna took pole during Friday's qualifying session, with slower track conditions on Saturday leaving most drivers unable to improve their times. During Saturday qualifying both Williams-Renault drivers spun at Revolver corner.

Race
Ayrton Senna was overtaken by Schumacher before the first corner and was then hit from behind by Mika Häkkinen and spun off the track. Nicola Larini also went off the track and crashed into Senna, causing race-ending damage to both cars. Mark Blundell also spun on the same corner after a collision at the apex of the first corner, stalling his car in the middle of the track. On lap 3 Damon Hill spun off trying to overtake Hakkinen, but rejoined and climbed back to second place before stopping with transmission failure on lap 49. As Jos Verstappen in the second Benetton retired after he spun off just as soon as he came out of the pits on lap 55 as he was 3 laps behind teammate Schumacher. Martin Brundle 
meanwhile was looking secure in 3rd place after Barrichello pitted before he retired shortly after with his engine overheating on lap 68. Alboreto and Wendlinger to whom were just behind the top 6 had collided and both went off into the gravel trap forcing both drivers to retire whilst the Minardi was trying to get past the Sauber at the time. Michael Schumacher won comfortably from Gerhard Berger and Rubens Barrichello. Roland Ratzenberger's 11th place would be the Austrian's only finish before his death during qualifying for the following Grand Prix at Imola.

Illegal driver aids
During the weekend, Ferrari test driver Nicola Larini (who had replaced the injured Jean Alesi for the early part of the season), leaked to the Italian media that he had used traction control (one of the banned for 1994 electronic driver aids) during the practice session for the race. Ferrari and Larini later denied the claims to the worldwide press. The "leak" by Larini further raised suspicions about teams using illegal aids to help them in races. Further, after the first corner collision that put him out of the race, instead of going back to the Williams pit area, Ayrton Senna opted to sit on the wall on the outside of the turn and watch the cars for a number of laps to see if he could hear any noises that suggested traction control was being used illegally in the other cars. Senna returned to the Williams pit area after about 10 laps had been completed, suspicious that the Benetton B194 was illegal.

Classification

Qualifying

Race

Championship standings after the race

Drivers' Championship standings

Constructors' Championship standings

References

Pacific Grand Prix
Pacific Grand Prix
Pacific Grand Prix
Pacific Grand Prix
Formula One controversies